Minne, a Middle High German word for "loving remembrance", may refer to:
Courtly love in the German courtly tradition
Frau Minne, a personification of romantic love in German courtly tradition

People
 Danièle Djamila Amrane-Minne (1939–2017), French-Algerian revolutionary
 George Minne (1866–1941), Belgian artist
 Joris Minne (1897–1988), Belgian artist
 Lona Minne, American politician
 Olivier Minne (born 1967), French television presenter and actor
 Stijn Minne (born 1978), Belgian footballer

See also
 Minnesang
 Minnie (disambiguation)